Le Vernet or Vernet is the name or part of the name of the following communes in France:

 Le Vernet, Allier, in the Allier department
 Le Vernet, Alpes-de-Haute-Provence, in the Alpes-de-Haute-Provence department
 Le Vernet, Ariège, in the Ariège department
 Vernet, Haute-Garonne, in the Haute-Garonne department
 Le Vernet, Haute-Loire, in the Haute-Loire department
 Vernet-la-Varenne, in the Puy-de-Dôme department
 Vernet-les-Bains, in the Pyrénées-Orientales department
 Le Vernet-Sainte-Marguerite, in the Puy-de-Dôme department

Other uses 
 Camp Vernet, a concentration camp in Le Vernet, Ariège 1940-44 under the Vichy government

See also 
 Vernet, a surname